Like a Virgin is the second studio album by American singer and songwriter Madonna, released on November 12, 1984, by Sire Records. Following the success of her self-titled debut album, Madonna wanted to become the record producer of her next album. However, her label was not ready to give her the artistic freedom and she chose Nile Rodgers instead to produce the album due to his work with David Bowie. Madonna wrote six songs on the record, five of which feature Steve Bray as a co-writer. The album was recorded at Power Station Studio in New York at a quick pace. Rodgers enlisted the help of his former Chic bandmates Bernard Edwards, who was the bassist, and Tony Thompson, who played drums. Jason Corsaro, the record's audio engineer, persuaded Rodgers to use digital recording, a new technique introduced at that time.

The album's photographs were shot by Steven Meisel. Madonna wanted the album title and the cover image to make a provocative link between her own religious name Madonna, as the Catholic title for Jesus' mother Mary, and the Christian concept of the virgin birth. While not a substantial musical departure from Madonna's first album, she felt that the material from Like a Virgin was stronger. After its release, Like a Virgin received mixed reviews from music critics; however, retrospective reviews of the album have been much more positive. Like a Virgin was a commercial success and became Madonna's first number one album on the Billboard 200 and set the record as the first female album in history  to sell over five million copies in the United States. The Recording Industry Association of America (RIAA) later certified it diamond for shipment of ten million units. It also reached number one in Germany, the Netherlands, New Zealand, Spain, Italy and the United Kingdom, and remains one of the best-selling albums of all time with sales of over 21 million copies worldwide.

Five singles were released from the album, including Madonna's first US number-one "Like a Virgin" and her first UK number-one "Into the Groove", the latter of which was introduced on the 1985 international reissue of the album. To promote the album, she embarked on The Virgin Tour, touring North America only. Like a Virgin has attained significance as a cultural artifact of the 1980s. Madonna proved that she was not a one-hit wonder and was able to provide herself with a permanent footing in the music world. Her songs became a lightning rod for both criticism by conservatives and imitation by the younger female population, especially "Material Girl" and "Like a Virgin". According to author J. Randy Taraborrelli, "Every important artist has at least one album in his or her career whose critical and commercial success becomes the artist's magic moment; for Madonna, Like a Virgin was just such a defining moment."

Background 

A former dancer and fixture on the New York club scene, Madonna Ciccone became known to the world simply as Madonna, with the release of her 1983 self-titled debut album Madonna. Fueled by hit songs like "Holiday", "Borderline" and "Lucky Star", the album was one of the best selling of the year and helped Madonna become one of the most exciting new artists of the 1980s. When she started work on her second album, Madonna felt that her first album had succeeded in introducing her "street-smart dance queen" persona, and she wanted to solidify and build upon that concept. According to her, "My work, my dedication—the stubbornness for getting Madonna released—had paid off. Now it was time to solidify my future."

For Like a Virgin, Madonna attempted to become one of the primary record producers, feeling the need to control the various aspects of her music. She believed that depending on a particular producer for her album was not something that suited her. Madonna said "I learnt my lesson while creating my debut album, and the way [Reggie, the producer of her debut project] Lucas left me in the water with the project, you can't trust men"—referring to the incident, when due to a certain difference of opinion between producer Reggie Lucas and Madonna, Lucas had left the project half-way. However, Warner Bros. Records was not ready to give her the artistic freedom that she wanted. In J. Randy Taraborrelli's biography of Madonna, she commented,

Ultimately, Nile Rodgers was chosen by Madonna as the producer of the album, with the approval of the Warner Brothers executives. Madonna chose Rodgers mostly because of his work as a member of the 1970s band Chic, and his most recent production work with David Bowie on his 1983 album Let's Dance. She commented, "When I was making the record, I was just so thrilled and happy to be working with Nile Rodgers. I idolized Nile because of the whole Chic thing. I couldn't believe that the record company gave me the money so that I could work with him."

For his part, Rodgers recalled that he had first seen Madonna perform at a small club in New York in 1983. In an interview with Time magazine, Rodgers explained: "I went to the club to see another woman sing, but when I got there Madonna was onstage. I loved her stage presence and then we met right after that. I kept thinking to myself, 'Damn, is she a star', but she wasn't at that time. I always wanted to work with her and Like a Virgin seemed like a perfect opportunity."

Recording 
The album was recorded at Power Station Studio in New York at a quick pace. Rodgers enlisted the help of his former Chic bandmates Bernard Edwards, who was the bassist, and Tony Thompson, who played the drums; they appeared on several tracks of the album. Rodgers decided to be the guitarist, when Edwards requested him to do so, in exchange for their help. The recording sessions did not start until the afternoon as Rodgers, who attended late-night parties, was not accustomed to work in early mornings. The schedule was also difficult for Madonna, who recalled that she used to "go to the swim club on the Upper West Side and go swimming and walk from there to the recording studio. It was impossible for me to reach there at morning." Rodgers recalled that Madonna was a hard worker and incredibly tenacious. He commented: "I am always amazed by Madonna's incredible judgement when it comes to making pop records. I've never seen anyone do it better, and that's the truth. When we did that album, it was the perfect union, and I knew it from the first day in the studio. The thing between us, man, it was sexual, it was passionate, it was creativity ... it was pop."

Jason Corsaro, the record's audio engineer, persuaded Rodgers to use digital recording, a new technique at the time which Corsaro believed was going to be the future of recording. To ensure this, Corsaro used a Sony 3324 24-track digital tape recorder and a Sony F1 two-track during the mixing of the tracks. Madonna recorded the lead parts of the songs in a small, wooden, high-ceilinged piano room at the back of Studio C, also known as Power Station's "R&B room". Corsaro then placed gobos around her while using the top capsule of a stereo AKG C24 tube microphone, with a Schoeps microphone preamplifier and a Pultec equalizer. Once the tracks met with everybody's approval, Robert Sabino added the keyboard parts, playing mostly a Sequential Circuits Prophet-5, as well as some Rhodes piano and acoustic piano, while Rodgers also played a Synclavier. Madonna, although not required, was present every minute of the recording sessions and the mixing process, Corsaro commented: "Nile was there most of the time, but she was there all of the time. She never left".

Packaging and title 

The cover sleeve and images were shot by Steven Meisel, who would become a regular collaborator with Madonna, in a suite at the St. Regis New York. Madonna wanted the album title to make provocative link between her own religious name—Madonna as the Catholic title for Jesus' mother Mary—and the Christian concept of the virgin birth. With the title song alluding to this concept, Madonna wanted the album cover to have mixed messages as well. Author Graham Thompson described that "reclining on a satin sheet, with a bouquet on her lap and wearing a wedding dress, a closer inspection reveals Madonna's image as highly fetishized and sexualized." He added that the heavy make-up, pouting lips, and despoiled hair, along with the tight-fitting bustier and full-length gloves, turned Madonna's image into a figure not of virtue, but of desire. This point, according to Thompson, is further emphasized by the belt she is wearing, the wording on which is just visible as "Boy Toy". He added: "The image was ambiguous and was based upon the fact that Madonna's appeal at that point of her career was not presenting herself just as an object of desire, but also as a desiring female subject".

Stephen Thomas Erlewine from AllMusic commented that the "Steven Meisel-shot cover ... was as key to her reinvention as the music of the album itself." William McKeen, author of Rock and roll is here to stay: an anthology, felt that the image was another trigger and testament to the fact that Madonna was the last word on fashion for women and young girls of that era, the epitome of cool. Costume designer Arianne Phillips commented of the Like a Virgin look: "This was one of the most shocking, liberating and influential moments in pop culture/fashion history ... Fashion has never been the same." Madonna herself declared: "I have always loved to play cat and mouse with the conventional stereotypes. My Like a Virgin album cover is a classic example. People were thinking who was I pretending to be—the Virgin Mary or the whore? These were the two extreme images of women I had known vividly, and remembered from childhood, and I wanted to play with them. I wanted to see if I can merge them together, Virgin Mary and the whore as one and all. The photo was a statement of independence, if you wanna be a virgin, you are welcome. But if you wanna be a whore, it's your fucking right to be so."

Composition 

According to Taraborrelli, "Madonna and Rodgers' collective energy—she wanting to score with a smash second album and he wanting to be the producer to give it to her—drove the production of Like a Virgin with great precision." Madonna also collaborated with her former boyfriend Steve Bray, who co-wrote many of the album's songs. Reflecting on the music composition for the album, Bray noted: "I've always kind of made the rib cage and the skeleton of the songs already—she's there for the last things like the eyebrows and the haircut." The opening track "Material Girl" was written by Peter Brown and Robert Rans. Madonna explained that the concept of the song was similar to her life's situation at that time. According to her, the song was provocative, hence she was attracted to it. "Material Girl" incorporated new wave music and consists of synth arrangements with a robotic voice repeating the hook. The lyrics identify with materialism, with Madonna asking for a rich and affluent life, rather than romance and relationships. Written by Madonna and Steve Bray, "Angel" is the second track on the album. It was one of the first songs developed for the project and, according to Madonna, was inspired by a girl who is saved by, and subsequently falls in love with an angel. "Angel" consists of a three-chord ascending hook, which serves as the verse and chorus. It has vocal harmonies beneath the main chorus and the lyrics repeat the angel-like image of Madonna's savior. The title track "Like a Virgin" was written by Billy Steinberg and Tom Kelly. Steinberg said that the song was inspired by his personal experiences of romance. It was chosen for Madonna by Michael Ostin of Warner Bros. Records, after listening to a demo sung by Kelly. However, Rodgers initially felt that the song did not have a good enough hook and was not suitable for Madonna, but subsequently changed his opinion after the hook was stuck in his mind. He credits Madonna with recognizing the song's potential: "I handed my apology to Madonna and said, 'you know ... if it's so catchy that it stayed in my head for four days, it must be something. So let's do it.'" "Like a Virgin" is a dance-oriented song, composed of two hooks. Madonna's voice is heard in a high register while a continuous arrangement of drums are heard along the bassline. According to author Rikky Rooksby, the lyrics of the song are ambiguous and consist of hidden innuendo. In sexual terms, the lyrics can be interpreted in different ways for different people.

In "Over and Over", Madonna sings about determination despite disappointments. The song consists of instrumentation from drums, synths and has a three-chord progression. An emotional moment occurred in the recording studio when Madonna covered the 1978 Rose Royce song "Love Don't Live Here Anymore". Rodgers recalled: "Madonna had never performed with a live orchestra before. I was very much into doing everything live, so I just said, 'Madonna, you go out there and sing and we will follow you.' At first Madonna was hesitant, but the live setting ended up producing memorable results. She sang and she was overcome with emotions and she started crying, but I left it on the record." The song features Madonna's vocals supported by acoustic guitars and synth strings, with Thompson playing the drum in the second verse. Towards the end, Madonna emotes in the voice of a soul singer.

"Dress You Up" was the last track to be added to the album as it was submitted late by songwriters Andrea LaRusso and Peggy Stanziale. Although Rodgers rejected it as he felt there was no time to compose a melody and record it for the album, Madonna pushed for the song's inclusion on Like a Virgin, as she particularly liked its lyrics. The song is a drum beat-driven dance track featuring instrumentation of guitars and vocals from a choir. The lyrics are an extended metaphor for fashion and sex, comparing dressing up with passion. "Shoo-Bee-Doo" contains homage to Motown music. Beginning with a slow introduction, the song is in the doo-wop genre and resembles the songs of early Sixties girl groups like The Shirelles or The Crystals. The saxophone breakdown is played by Lenny Pickett. The lyrics discuss relationship problems, and are phrased as clichés in the coda. "Pretender" starts with the chorus and then moves to the verse. It talks about seduction and the insecurity felt by a woman who feels that things are moving too quickly for her with her man. "Stay" is the final track on the album. Using triple-rhythms and double-tracked vocals, the song includes a noise resembling someone slapping a microphone and a spoken sequence which fades away in the end.

"Into the Groove" was added as a bonus track in the 1985 international reissue of Like a Virgin. Madonna's inspiration behind the song was the dance floor, and she wrote it while watching a handsome Puerto Rican man across her balcony. Initially written for her friend Mark Kamins, Madonna later decided to use it in the soundtrack of her 1985 film Desperately Seeking Susan. Unlike the other songs on Like a Virgin, "Into the Groove" was recorded at Sigma Sound Studios, and produced by Madonna and Stephen Bray. Madonna's friend Erika Belle was present during the recording and watched the whole process. In Andrew Morton's Madonna biography, she noted that at one point of the recording, Bray was facing difficulties with the bridge of the song, as the melody thought by him was not syncing with the rest of the composition. Undeterred by his obvious difficulties, Madonna stepped up to the microphone and sang the words "Live out your fantasy here with me". Bray's problem was solved; Belle remembered the experience as: "[The song] seemed to come out of her, I was awestruck." The song consists of instrumentation from drums, percussion, congas and whistles. Madonna's voice is double-tracked in the chorus. The lyrics are simple, and written as an invitation to dance with the singer, with sexual innuendos and undertones in the meaning.

Promotion

Live performances 

Madonna debuted the first single "Like a Virgin" at the first MTV Video Music Awards on September 14, 1984, where she appeared on stage atop a giant wedding cake dressed in a wedding dress, adorned with the infamous "Boy Toy" belt buckle, and veil. The climax of her risqué performance found her masturbating and rolling around on the stage. The performance is noted as one of the iconic performance in MTV's history. On December 13, 1984, Madonna performed "Like a Virgin" on BBC One's program Top of the Pops, wearing punky torn tights, a vivid pink wig, religious accessories and layered mesh tops. It was later voted as the second best Top of the Pops performance of all time. She also appeared at the 1985 Live Aid charity concert, where she performed "Into the Groove".

The album was further promoted on her first headlining tour, The Virgin Tour, which only visited cities in the United States and Canada. Early on there were plans to schedule dates in England and Japan due to Madonna's large fan base in both countries. However, the final schedule did not reflect the idea. In the end several more US dates were added and moved to larger concert venues due to overwhelmingly strong ticket sales. Madonna's performance on the tour was described by Taraborrelli as "full of excitement", singing songs from her debut album as well as Like a Virgin, and asking the audience "Will you marry me?" The costumes included colorful new wave jackets for "Holiday" and white wedding gowns similar to the one worn in her "Like a Virgin" music video. Referring to her Detroit roots and contemporary artist Michael Jackson, Madonna sang a verse of "Billie Jean" during "Like a Virgin".

The Virgin Tour was a success and collected a total of more than US$5 million. During a 2009 interview with Rolling Stone, interviewer Austin Scaggs asked Madonna regarding her feelings and emotions during the tour, since it was the first time she was playing in arenas. Madonna replied saying,

Singles 

"Like a Virgin" was released as the lead single from the album in late 1984. It received positive reviews from contemporary as well as old critics, who frequently called it as one of the defining songs for Madonna. It became her first number-one single on the Billboard Hot 100, while reaching the top of the charts in Australia, Canada and Japan and the top-ten of other countries. The song was certified gold by the Recording Industry Association of America (RIAA) on January 10, 1985, for shipping a million copies across United States – the requirement for a gold single prior to 1989. The music video portrayed Madonna sailing down the riverways of Venice in a gondola, as well as roaming around a palace wearing a white wedding dress. With the video, scholars noted Madonna's portrayal of a sexually independent woman, the symbolism of the appearance of a man with lion's mask to that of Saint Mark, and compared the eroticism of the video to the vitality of the city of Venice.

"Material Girl" was the second single from the album, released in November 1984. Critics have frequently noted "Material Girl" and "Like a Virgin" as the songs that made Madonna an icon. The song was a commercial success, reaching the top-five in Australia, Belgium, Canada, Ireland, Japan and United Kingdom. It reached position two on the Billboard Hot 100 in the United States. The music video was a mimicry of Marilyn Monroe's performance of the song "Diamonds Are a Girl's Best Friend" from the 1953 film Gentlemen Prefer Blondes. The mimicked scenes are interspersed with scenes of a Hollywood producer trying to win the heart of an actress, played by Madonna herself. Discovering that, contrary to her song, the young woman was not impressed by money and expensive gifts, he pretended to be penniless and succeeded in taking her out on a date.

"Angel" was the third released single from the album, in April 1985. Critics gave mixed review of the song, with one group denoting it as a classic while the others felt it was sub-par compared to the other Madonna singles. "Angel" became Madonna's fifth consecutive top-five single on the Billboard Hot 100 and reached the top of its dance chart. 

"Into the Groove"  was released as a single in Europe, Asia and South America in July 1985. The song was appreciated by contemporary critics as well as authors, who have frequently called it "Madonna's first great single". "Into the Groove" reached the top of the charts in Australia, Belgium, Ireland, Japan, Netherlands, New Zealand, and the United Kingdom, where it was Madonna's first number-one single. In the United States, the song was only available as the B-side of the 12-inch single of "Angel", therefore it was ineligible to chart on the Billboard Hot 100 at the time. It reached number one on the US Hot Dance Club Play chart where it was listed as a double-sided single with "Angel". In Australia and Canada, the song also was released as a double-sided single with, "Angel".

"Dress You Up" was the last single from the album. Critics reacted positively to the dance-pop nature of the track. "Dress You Up" became Madonna's sixth consecutive top-five single in the United States. It also reached the top-ten in Australia, Belgium, Canada, Ireland, New Zealand and the United Kingdom. The music video for the single is taken from the live performance from The Virgin Tour, filmed in Detroit.

Two further singles were released internationally from the album. "Over and Over" was released in late 1985 exclusively in Italy.

"Love Don't Live Here Anymore" was released in early 1986 exclusively in Japan.

Critical reception 

According to Q magazine, Like a Virgin was the album that "propelled [Madonna] into the stratosphere – and rightly so. The songs are smart, funny, sexy and irresistible." Taraborrelli said, "It was Like a Virgin which reflected Madonna as a more versatile and artistic performer and vocals on this album being reflectively sharper in contrast to her early works in the music industry." Michael Paoletta from Billboard commented that the songs on the album sustain a "fevered dance-rock momentum". In his review for AllMusic, Stephen Thomas Erlewine commented, "Overall, the album adds up to less than the sum of its parts—partially because the singles are so good, but also because on the first album, she stunned with style and a certain joy. Here, the calculation is apparent, and while that's part of Madonna's essence—even something that makes her fun—it throws the record's balance off a little too much for it to be consistent, even if it justifiably made her a star." Debby Miller from Rolling Stone preferred Madonna's debut album over Like a Virgin. In The Village Voice, Robert Christgau was also lukewarm towards the record, writing "[Madonna's] so sure of herself she's asking men and women both to get the hots for the calculating bitch who sells the fantasy even while she bids for the sincerity market where long-term superstars ply their trade. And to make the music less mechanical, she's hired Nile Rodgers, who I won't blame for making it less catchy."

Jim Farber from Entertainment Weekly said that "In addition to raising the Madonna/whore ante with songs like the title cut, Virgin cradled the kind of '80s hits ("Dress You Up") built to transcend the Dynasty era." Alfred Soto from Stylus Magazine remembered the first time that he heard the songs from the album and commented, "Lots of critics think something similar occurred when Madonna followed her eponymous debut with Like a Virgin, helmed by Nile Rodgers with all the fixin's—too calculated next to the 'raw passion' of the debut. This is nonsense; it misses how Madonna conflated notions of spontaneity and calculation. Rodgers is the ideal collaborator." Stephen Holden from The New York Times said: "With a tough-cookie voice that's both coy and streetwise, Madonna's singing harks back to the rock-and-roll girl-group tradition that preceded the Beatles. But where girl groups, from the Shirelles to the Ronettes, worshipfully extolled their boyfriends' cars, haircuts and rebel poses, Madonna's point of view is decidedly more self-interested. In matters of love, she is a comparison shopper with a shrewd sense of her own market value. The words 'shiny and new' describe not only the way the love-smitten singer feels in the title song but the sound of the album."

Matt Damsker from the Los Angeles Times commented: "Madonna's beating vibrato sometimes makes her sound so robotic in the album." Lou Papineau, while writing for The Providence Journal, said that "In Like a Virgin, Madonna proves she's shallow, but spunky." Sal Cinquemani from Slant Magazine gave a positive review, saying "Though not as innovative as her debut, Like a Virgin stands as one of the most definitive pop artifacts from the indulgent Reagan Era. The mid-tempo ballad 'Shoo-Bee-Doo' and a soulful cover of Rose Royce's 'Love Don't Live Here Anymore' proved Madonna could churn out more than just novelty hits, while the sugary 'Angel' and the irresistible 'Dress You Up' contributed to the singer's record-breaking list of consecutive Top 5 hits (16 in all). The retro-infused 'Stay' and the percussive 'Over and Over' are the album's hidden gems." Ed Stevenson from People felt that "Madonna does have a sense of humor, though she is buried under so many layers of self-parody it's hard to tell sometimes ... She is backed on this by the reliable rhythmic touch of veteran Nile Rodgers, whose contributions have helped her create a tolerable bit of fluff. Hugo Mistry from the Chicago Tribune felt that "Like a Virgin was Madonna's breakthrough, playing off her self-conscious campiness with a series of hot dance tracks, attention-grabbing lyrics and steamy videos."

Commercial performance 

Like a Virgin was recorded and finished by September 1984, but the release of the album was held up, much to Madonna's frustration, by the continuing sales of her debut album, which was approaching two million sales in the United States. Like a Virgin debuted at number 70 on the Billboard 200 issued for December 1, 1984. The album reached the top ten of the Billboard 200 on December 8, 1984, and after one month reached the top of the chart on February 9, 1985, where it stayed for three weeks. It also reached a peak of ten on the Top R&B/Hip-Hop Albums chart. After 14 weeks, the album sold 3.5 million copies. By July 1985, Like a Virgin became the first album by a female artist to be certified for sales of five million units in the United States. It was eventually certified ten times platinum (diamond) by the Recording Industry Association of America (RIAA), for shipment of ten million copies of the album. It placed at three on the year-end chart for 1985, with Madonna becoming the top pop artist for the year. After the advent of the Nielsen SoundScan era in 1991, the album sold a further 574,000 copies. It sold additional 882,000 units at the BMG Music Club, which are not counted by the Nielsen SoundScan. In Canada, the album debuted at number 78 on the RPM Albums Chart, on November 10, 1984. It reached a peak of number three, on February 16, 1985. The album was present for a total of 74 weeks on the chart, and was certified diamond by the Canadian Recording Industry Association (CRIA), for shipment of one million copies of the album. Like a Virgin ranked sixth on the RPM Top 100 Albums for 1985. As of June 1986, the album sold more than 750,000 units in Latin America.

In the United Kingdom, Like a Virgin debuted at number 74 on the UK Albums Chart, on January 12, 1985. However, the album fluctuated on the chart for the next eight months and it was only in September that it finally reached the top of the chart. It spent two alternative weeks at the top (21st Sept and 12th Oct 1985), and a total of 152 weeks on the chart. The album was certified three times platinum by the British Phonographic Industry (BPI) and has sold over a million copies there. In France, the album debuted at number five on the French Albums Chart on October 6, 1985, staying there for eight weeks, then descending down the chart. It was certified two times platinum by the Syndicat National de l'Édition Phonographique (SNEP) for shipment of 600,000 copies. In Australia, the album debuted and peaked at two on the Kent Music Report albums chart, and was certified seven times platinum by the Australian Recording Industry Association (ARIA) for shipment of 490,000 copies of the album. It reached the top of the New Zealand Albums Chart for three consecutive weeks and was certified five times platinum by the Recording Industry Association of New Zealand (RIANZ) for shipment of 75,000 copies. Elsewhere, Like a Virgin reached number one in Germany, the Netherlands and Spain, while peaking within the top five in many other countries, including Austria, Japan, Sweden and Switzerland. It also became Madonna's first number-one album on the European Top 100 Albums, reaching the summit on November 23, 1985, for two weeks, and sold over 2 million copies across Europe at the end of the 1985 year. Like a Virgin has sold more than 21 million copies worldwide and became one of the best-selling albums of all time.

Legacy 

After the release of Like a Virgin, Stephen Holden commented in The New York Times: "No phenomenon illustrates more pointedly how pop music history seems to run in cycles than the overnight success of the 24-year-old pop siren known as Madonna. The month before Christmas, Madonna's second album, Like a Virgin sold more than two million copies. Teen-agers were lining up in stores to purchase the album the way their parents had lined up to buy Beatles records in the late 60's." Madonna proved she was not a one-hit wonder with the release of the album which sold 12 million copies worldwide at the time of its release. In 2016, Billboard ranked at number nine in the list of Certified Diamond Albums From Worst to Best. Like a Virgin was placed at fifth at Album of the Decade by Billboard—the highest peak by a female performer.

Taraborrelli felt that "Like a Virgin is really a portrait of Madonna's uncanny pop instincts empowered by her impatient zeal for creative growth and her innate knack for crafting a good record." He added that the success of the album made it clear what was Madonna's real persona. "She was a street-smart dance queen with the sexy allure of Marilyn Monroe, the coy iciness of Marlene Dietrich and the cutting and protective glibness of a modern Mae West". Although the album received mixed reviews, Taraborrelli believed that the "mere fact that at the time of its release so many couldn't resist commenting on the record was a testament to the continuous, growing fascination with Madonna ... Every important artist has at least one album in his or her career whose critical and commercial success becomes the artist's magic moment; for Madonna, Like a Virgin was just such a defining moment."

Chris Smith, author of 101 Albums That Changed Popular Music, believed that it was with Like a Virgin that Madonna was able to steal the spotlight towards herself. She asserted her sexuality as only male rock stars had done before, moving well beyond the limited confines of being a pop artist, to becoming a focal point for nationwide discussions of power relationships in the areas of sex, race, gender, religion, and other divisive social topics. Her songs became a lightning rod for both criticism by conservatives and imitation by the younger female population. Consequence of Sound ranked the album at number two on "The 10 Greatest Sophomore Albums of All Time," calling it the album that "carved out the throne...that would be Madonna's forever: the Queen of Pop."

Track listing 
All tracks produced by Nile Rodgers, except "Into the Groove" produced by Madonna and Stephen Bray.

Personnel 
Credits adapted from the album's liner notes.

 Madonna – lead vocals , background vocals 
 Nile Rodgers – Roland Juno-60 , Synclavier II , guitars , acoustic guitar , electric guitar , string arrangements and conductor 
 Nathaniel S. Hardy, Jr. – keyboards 
 Robert Sabino – synthesizers , bass synthesizer , acoustic piano 
 Bernard Edwards – bass 
 Tony Thompson – drums 
 Jimmy Bralower – LinnDrum and Simmons drum machine programming 
 Lenny Pickett – saxophone solo 
 Karen Milne – string contractor   
 Kermit Moore – string contractor  
 Curtis King – background vocals 
 Frank Simms – background vocals 
 George Simms – background vocals 
 Brenda King – background vocals

Design 
 Jeri McManus – art direction, design
 Jeffrey Kent Ayeroff – art direction, design
 Steven Meisel – photography
 Maripol – stylist

Production 
 Madonna – producer 
 Stephen Bray – producer 
 Nile Rodgers – producer 
 Jason Corsaro – recording engineer , audio mixing 
 Rob "Ace" Eaton – second engineer 
 Gus Skinas – digital editing
 Eric Mohler – digital editing assistant
 Malcolm Pollack – digital editing assistant
 Bob Ludwig – audio mastering at Masterdisk (New York City, New York)
 Budd Tunick – production manager
 Weisner-DeMann Entertainment – management

Record company 
 Sire Records – record label, U.S. copyright owner 
 Warner Bros. Records – U.S. marketing and distributor  record label, copyright owner 
 WEA International – international distributor, international copyright owner

Charts

Weekly charts

Year-end charts

Decade-end charts

All-time chart

Certifications and sales

See also 

 List of best-selling albums
 List of best-selling albums by women
 List of best-selling albums in Brazil
 List of best-selling albums in Italy
 List of best-selling albums in the United States
 List of best-selling albums of the 1980s in the United Kingdom
 List of albums which have spent the most weeks on the UK Albums Chart
 List of Australian chart achievements and milestones
 List of diamond-certified albums in Canada
 List of European number-one hits of 1985
 List of UK Albums Chart number ones of the 1980s
 List of number-one albums of 1985 (U.S.)
 List of number-one hits of 1985 (Germany)

Notes

References

Book sources

External links 
 
 

1984 albums
Albums produced by Nile Rodgers
Albums produced by Stephen Bray
Albums produced by Madonna
Madonna albums
Sire Records albums
Warner Records albums
Dance-rock albums